Tremble Under Boom Lights is an EP by Jonathan Fire*Eater, released in 1996. It was the first release on The Medicine Label after it split from Giant Records the previous fall.
The EP was distributed by the Alternative Distribution Alliance. The five songs on the EP were written while the band's members were living in a farmhouse in Ithaca, New York.

In 2019, the release was reissued along with bonus tracks from their 1995 single self-titled single (also referred to by its first track, "The Public Hanging of a Movie Star") as well as a cover of "The City Never Sleeps" and the previous unreleased track "In the Head".

Track listing

References

1996 EPs